The following is a list of '''infantry equipment of the People's Liberation Army of China'.

Pistols
 QSZ-92 - 9 mm and 5.8 mm pistol (in service-main)
 QSZ-193 - 9 mm compact pistol
 QX-04 - modular designed pistol
 QSW-06 - 5.8 mm silenced pistol, replacing the Type 67 silenced pistol (in service)
 Type 84 - 7.62 mm small pistol for security and police forces (in service)
 Type 77 - 7.62 mm pistol for People's Armed Police and People's Police (in service)
 Type 67 - 7.62 mm silenced pistol
 Type 64 - 7.62 mm semi-automatic pistol, first firearm to be indigenously developed by the People's Republic of China. Withdrawn from army but in service with the People's Armed Police and People's Police (retired from service)

Submachine guns
 QCQ-171 - 9 mm submachine gun
 CF-05 - 9 mm submachine gun
 QCW-05 - 5.8 mm suppressed submachine gun
 Type 82 - 9 mm submachine gun (Chinese copy of Polish PM-63 RAK)
 Type 85 - 7.62 mm simplified and suppressed Type 79 submachine gun
 Type 79 - 7.62 mm submachine gun (in service with airborne and special forces troops)
 Type 64 - 7.62 mm suppressed low flash submachine gun

Rifles

 QBZ-191 - 5.8 mm assault rifle
 QBZ-95 - 5.8 mm bullpup assault rifle
 QTS-11 - 5.8 mm assault rifle with integrated airburst grenade launcher (in limited service)
 QBZ-03 - 5.8 mm assault rifle
 Type 86 - 7.62 mm bullpup assault rifle (not in service)
 Type 87 - 5.8 mm assault rifle, using similar design to the Type 81 (not in service)
 Type 81 - 7.62 mm assault rifle (in service with reserves and militia)
 Type 63 - 7.62 mm assault rifle
 Type 56- 7.62 mm assault rifle, Chinese derivative of the AK-47 (phased out)

Machine guns

 QJB-191 - 5.8 mm light support weapon (LSW)
 QJS-161 - 5.8 mm light machine gun (LMG)
 QJY-201 - 7.62 mm general-purpose machine gun (GPMG)
 QJZ-171 - 12.7 mm lightweight heavy machine gun (HMG)
 QBB-95 - 5.8 mm light support weapon (LSW)
 QJY-88 - 5.8 mm light machine gun, replacing Type 67 general-purpose machine gun
 Type 80 - 7.62 mm general-purpose machine gun (derivative of the Soviet PKM)
 Type 67 - 7.62 mm general-purpose machine gun, replacing the Type 53 (SG43) and Type 57 (SGM) 7.62 mm general-purpose machine guns

Sniper rifles

 QBU-191 - 5.8×42mm selective fire designated marksman rifle (DMR)
 QBU-203 - 7.62×51mm bolt action sniper rifle
 QBU-202 - 8.6×70mm bolt action sniper rifle
 QBU-201 - 12.7×108mm bolt action anti-materiel sniper rifle
 QBU-10 - 12.7×108mm semi-automatic anti-materiel sniper rifle
 AMR-2 - 12.7×108mm bolt action anti-materiel sniper rifle
 W-03
 JS 7.62 - 7.62×54mmR sniper rifle (in limited service)
 QBU-88 - 5.8×42mm bullpup designated marksman rifle (in service)
 CS/LR4 - 7.62×51mm sniper rifle (in service)
 CS/LR3 - 5.8×42mm sniper rifle (in service)
 Type 85 - 7.62×54mmR sniper rifle updated from the Type 79 (in limited service)
 Type 79 - 7.62×54mmR sniper rifle, derivative of Soviet Dragunov (in service)

Shoulder-launched weapons
 FN-6 - MANPADS
 HN-5 - MANPADS
 HJ-12 - shoulder-launched anti-tank missile system
 DZJ-08 - multi-purpose recoilless gun specialized for combat in urban area and confined space, replacing PF-89 and Type 69 RPG
 PF-98 - 120 mm anti-tank rocket launcher
 PF-97 - 80 mm fuel air explosive rocket launcher
 PF-89 - 80 mm lightweight anti-tank rocket launcher, replacing the Type 69-1 RPG
 FHJ-84 - 2 × 62 mm rocket launcher
 Type 79
 Type 69 RPG - 40 mm RPG launcher, derivative of RPG-7

Automatic grenade launchers
 QLU-11 - 35x32 mm semi-automatic grenade sniper
 LG-1
 LG-2
 LG-3
 QLT-89
 QLB-06 - improved variant of QLZ-87
 QLZ-04 - automatic grenade launcher for squad fire support. Can be mounted on the tripod or vehicles.
 QLZ-87 - standard fire support grenade launcher of PLAGF for individual usage.

Grenades
 35 mm grenade - 35 mm Chinese grenades
 Type 90 - 40 mm
 Type 69 - 40 mm

Hand grenades
 Type 18
 FSL02 smoke grenade. The grenade weights 750 grams, and has a length of 140mm with a diameter of 65mm. Duration is 2 minutes at 2-5m/s wind speed. The body has pale green color with white or black band indicating the color of smoke (white/black). The smoke grenade went in service in 1995, replacing FSL01 smoke grande that has been in service since 1963.
 WY-91
 Type 86
 Type 82-2
 Type 79
 Type 77-1
 Type 59, derivative of the Soviet RGD-5

Mortars
 Type 86 - 120 mm
 Type 89 - 100 mm
 Type 80 - 100 mm
 W-99 - 82 mm
 Type 87 - 82 mm
 Type 84 - 82 mm
 Type 90 - 60 mm
 Type 93 - 60 mm

Flamethrowers
 Type 74
 Type 58

Infantry operated anti-aircraft guns
 QJG-02 - 14.5 mm  heavy machine gun
 QJZ-89 - 12.7 mm lightweight heavy machine gun
 QJC-88 - 12.7 mm vehicle-mounted machine gun
 Type 77/Type 85 - 12.7 mm emplacement machine gun
 Type 85 - 23 mm double barrel air defense cannon
 Type 80 - 23 mm double barrel air defense cannon
 Type 74 - 37 mm double barrel air defense cannon
 Type 72 - 85 mm air defense cannon
 Type 71 - 30 mm air defense cannon
 Type 59 - 57 mm air defense cannon
 Type 58 - 2 X 14.5 mm
 Type 54 - 12.7 mm

See also
 People's Liberation Army
 People's Liberation Army Ground Force

References

Weapons of the People's Republic of China
People's Liberation Army